Daltonia, also known as the John H. Dalton House, was a historic home located near Houstonville, Iredell County, North Carolina.  It was built in 1858, and is a two-story, three-bay by two-bay, Greek Revival style frame dwelling.  It has a gable roof, two-story rear ell, and the front facade features a two-story pedimented portico.  Also on the property is a contributing -story small log house and a loom house. 

It was added to the National Register of Historic Places in 1980.

References

Houses on the National Register of Historic Places in North Carolina
Greek Revival houses in North Carolina
Houses completed in 1858
Houses in Iredell County, North Carolina
National Register of Historic Places in Iredell County, North Carolina